The 2019 Nigerian House of Representatives elections in Anambra State was held on February 23, 2019, to elect members of the House of Representatives to represent Anambra State, Nigeria.

Overview

Summary

Results

Aguata
A total of 20 candidates registered with the Independent National Electoral Commission to contest in the election. APGA candidate Umeoji Chukwuma Michael won the election, defeating Azodo Eucharia of PDP and  other party candidates.

Anambra East/West
A total of 19 candidates registered with the Independent National Electoral Commission to contest in the election. APGA candidate Obidigwe Chinedu Benjamin won the election, defeating Nwoye Ernest Anichebe of PDP and  other party candidates.

Awka North/South
A total of 21 candidates registered with the Independent National Electoral Commission to contest in the election. PDP candidate Onwuaso Chinedu won the election, defeating APGA Nnebe Anayo and other party candidates.

Idemili North/South
A total of 21 candidates registered with the Independent National Electoral Commission to contest in the election. APGA candidate Ibezi Ifeanyi Anthony won the election, defeating Obinna Chidoka of PDP and  other party candidates.

Ihiala
A total of 13 candidates registered with the Independent National Electoral Commission to contest in the election. APGA candidate Ifeanyi Chudy Momah won the election, defeating PDP and other party candidates.

Njikoka/Dunukofia/Anaocha
A total of 17 candidates registered with the Independent National Electoral Commission to contest in the election. PDP candidate won the election, defeating Nwankwo Ferdinand Dozie of APGA and  other party candidates.

Nnewi North/South/Ekwusigo
A total of 21 candidates registered with the Independent National Electoral Commission to contest in the election. PDP candidate Chris Emeka Azubogu won the election, defeating Nwabunike Anthony Iju of APGA and other party candidates.

Ogbaru
A total of 14 candidates registered with the Independent National Electoral Commission to contest in the election. PDP candidate Onyema Chukwuka Wilfred won the election, defeating APGA Nwaebili Chinwe Clare and other party candidates.

Onitsha North/South
A total of 15 candidates registered with the Independent National Electoral Commission to contest in the election. PDP candidate Lynda Chuba Ikpeazu won the election, defeating Patrick Obianwu Nwachi of APGA and  other party candidates.

Orumba North/South
A total of 5 candidates registered with the Independent National Electoral Commission to contest in the election. APGA candidate Ezenwankwo Okwudili Christopher won the election, defeating Princess Chinwe Nnabuife Clara of YPP and other party candidates.

Oyi/Ayamelum
A total of 3 candidates registered with the Independent National Electoral Commission to contest in the election. PDP candidate Bar. Vincent Ofumelu won the election, defeating Ekene Enefe of APGA and Chinedu Eluemunoh of APC.

References 

Anambra State House of Representatives elections
2019 Anambra State elections
2019 Nigerian House of Representatives elections